Juraj Kuniak (born 2 July 1955) is a Slovak poet and writer. He was born in Košice, Slovakia.

Works

Poetry
1983 – Premietanie na viečka
1994 – Kúsok svetového priestoru
1995 – Blúdivý nerv
2001 – Cor cordi
2008 – Čiara horizontu
2008 – Zápisník lyrického spravodajcu / Notebook of a Lyrical Correspondent
2012 – Lamium album (co-author: Ján Kudlička)
2015 – Za mestom
2016 – Rosa mystica (co-author: Ján Kudlička)

Co-author of poetry
2011 – Mávnutie krídel. 42 slovenských haiku (co-authors: Erik Jakub Groch, Mila Haugová, Daniel Hevier, Igor Hochel, Karol Chmel, Rudolf Jurolek, Ivan Kadlečík, Anna Ondrejková, Dana Podracká, Ján Zambor)
2012 – Proglas. Preklady a básnické interpretácie (co-authors: Konštantín Filozof, Eugen Pauliny, Viliam Turčány, Ľubomír Feldek, Ján Buzássy, Mila Haugová, Ján Zambor, Katarína Džunková, Daniel Hevier, Erik Ondrejička, Anna Ondrejková, Rudolf Jurolek, Dana Podracká)

Collected edition of poetry
2004 – Skalná ruža – a triptych includes Premietanie na viečka, Blúdivý nerv and Kúsok svetového priestoru
2019 – Amonit – selected poems 2008-2016

Translations of poetry
2013 – Walt Whitman – Song of Myself – translation into Slovak language: Spev o mne
2019 – Walt Whitman – Song of Myself – translation into Slovak language: Spev o mne (Second, revised edition)
2019 – Robert Hass – Time and Materials – translation into Slovak language: Čas a materiály

Prose
1991 – Pán Černovský
1993 – Súkromný skanzen – Etudy o etniku
2002 – Nadmorská výška 23 rokov
2003 – Púť k sebe
2008 – Mystérium krajiny / Mystery of Landscape
2013 – Dhaulágirí – Biela hora (co-author: photographer Marián Kováč)
2018 – Nepálsky diptych: Dhaulágirí – Biela hora & Makalu – Čierny obor (co-author: photographer Marián Kováč)

Books in other languages
1989 – Podívej se na básničku, Czech
2004 – Nadmořská výška 23 let, Czech
2004 – Mister Cernovsky, English
2005 – Man in the wind, English
2006 – A Bit of the World's Space, English
2007 – Cor cordi, English
2008 – The line of the horizon, Hungarian, German, Czech, Polish, Finnish, Swedish, Norwegian, Danish, English, Flemish, Dutch, French, Italian, Castilian, Portuguese, Spanish, Japanese, Chinese, Mongolian, Russian, Arabic, Hebrew, Greek, Macedonian, Ukrainian, Slovenian
2008 – Notebook of a Lyrical Correspondent, English
2010 – Nervus vagus, Czech
2012 – Lamium album, Polish, German, English
2013 – Dhaulagiri - Vitt berg, Swedish
2016 – Rosa mystica, Polish, German, English
2019 – Amonit, Belorussian 
2019 – Amonit, Serbian

References
 Slovak Literature Centre 
 Slovak PEN Centre
 Open Library

1955 births
Living people
Slovak poets
Writers from Košice